The Art of Drowning is a book of poetry by the American Poet Laureate Billy Collins, first published in 1995. John Updike described the collection as "Lovely poems—lovely in a way almost nobody's since [Theodore] Roethke's are. Limpid, gently and consistently startling, more serious than they seem, they describe all the worlds that are and were and some others besides." The title poem is the 11th poem in the collection, and it describes a man who reflects on the course of his life while he is drowning.

Contents

 Dear Reader	
 Consolation	
 Osso Buco	
 Directions	
 Influence	
 Water Table	
 Reading in a Hammock	
 Print	
 Sunday Morning with the Sensational Nightingales	
 Cheers	
 The Best Cigarette	
 Metropolis	
 Days	
 Tuesday, June , 	
 The Art of Drowning	
 Canada	
 The Biography of a Cloud	
 Death Beds	
 Conversion	
 Horizon	
 The City of Tomorrow	
 Thesaurus	
 Fiftieth Birthday Eve	
 On Turning Ten	
 Shadow	
 Workshop	
 Keats's Handwriting	
 Budapest	
 My Heart	
 Romanticism	
 Monday Morning	
 Dancing Toward Bethlehem	
 The First Dream	
 Sweet Talk	
 Dream	
 Man in Space	
 Philosophy	
 While Eating a Pear	
 The End of the World	
 Center	
 Design	
 The Invention of the Saxophone	
 Medium	
 Driving Myself to a Poetry Reading	
 Pinup	
 Piano Lessons	
 Exploring the Coast of Birdland	
 The Blues	
 Nightclub
 Some Final Words

References

American poetry collections
1995 poetry books